Marek Rutka (born 12 June 1975) is a Polish journalist, economist, academic teacher and politician. Member of the Sejm for New Left. Since 2022 he is also a member of National Media Council.

Electoral history

References

1975 births
Living people
People from Gdynia
Members of the Polish Sejm 2019–2023